The L&YR Class 3 was a class of 4-4-0 steam locomotives of the Lancashire and Yorkshire Railway introduced in 1891 with forty being built.  George Hughes rebuilt six locomotives with superheaters between 1908 and 1909, they were later designated L&YR Class 4.  All passed to the London, Midland and Scottish Railway at the grouping in 1923 but were withdrawn by 1930.

Design

Origins
Aspinall then produced a modified version with 6ft wheels which was the basis for the class 3.

Class 3
John Aspinall succeeded Barton Wright in 1886.

Class 4
Six locomotives were rebuilt with superheaters by George Hughes between 1908 and 1909.  They became L&YR Class 4 in the Hughes classification scheme introduced in 1919.  All six passed to the London, Midland and Scottish Railway at the grouping in 1923.

There were two different versions of the rebuild. One had 19" bore cylinders and Joy valve gear. The other had 20" bore cylinders and Walschaerts valve gear.

Numbering
The L&YR numbered them 1093-1229 and then randomly, using numbers between 318 and 498. The LMS numbered its 34 Class 3 locomotives 10150-10183. The six which had been rebuilt to Class 4 were numbered in a separate series, LMS 10190-10195.

Class 4 numbering

Withdrawal
Withdrawals began in 1925 and the Class 4 superheated locomotives were all withdrawn by 1926.  The last members of the type were withdrawn in 1930.  None have been preserved.

References

Bibliography 

4-4-0 locomotives
03
Railway locomotives introduced in 1891
Standard gauge steam locomotives of Great Britain
Scrapped locomotives